Novi Pazar City Stadium, referred to as Caizcoin Arena for sponsorship reasons, is a football stadium in Novi Pazar, Serbia and the home of FK Novi Pazar. The stadium currently has a seating capacity of 10,000 people.

History
Novi Pazar's City Stadium began a complete overhaul in 2011. The cost of the project was reported to be around €2 million. The stadium was opened to the public after reconstruction on 12 April 2012.

Reconstruction 
The stadium began undergoing complete reconstruction during the first half of 2011 in an ambitious project by the Football Association of Serbia and the city of Novi Pazar. The project includes the renovation of the eastern, west and northern stands. When reconstruction finished, the stadium's seating capacity was increased to 10,000 spectators. The project includes also the covering of the whole stadium, new floodlights, new locker and press room, new ambulance, parking area, ticket office. After reconstruction, the stadium is expected to fulfill the most up to date UEFA standards. The cost of the project is estimated to be over 230 million Serbian dinars (2 million euros).

See also
List of stadiums in Serbia

References 

Novi Pazar
Stadium